= Championnat National du Futsal D1 =

Moroccan futsal league

- Founded: 2009
- Country: Morocco
- Confederation: CAF
- Level on pyramid: 1
- Domestic cup: Moroccan Cup
- Current champions: Union Touarga (2025-26)
- Most championships: CFSS (7 titles)
- Website: Official website
- Current: 2026–27

Moroccan Futsal Championship (Arabic: بطولة مغربية لكرة الصالة) is the premier futsal league in Morocco. The competition is run by the Championnat National du Futsal D1 under the auspices of the Royal Moroccan Football Federation.

== Teams ==
- ACDK : Club Dynamo Kenitra
- CFSS : Club Feth Sportif Settat
- ASFA : Association Sportive Faucon Agadir
- AVHK : Association Ville Haute Kenitra
- AZYO : Association Zarkae el Yamama Oujda
- CAFK : Club Ajax Futsal Kenitra
- CJK : Club Jeunesse Khouribga
- CNM : Club Nejm Mdagh Berkane
- CSAT : Club Sportif Ajax Tanger
- FCAAT : Futsal Club Association Ajax Tetouan
- KACS : Kenitra Athletic Club Sebou
- RCA : Raja Club Athletic
- SCCM : Sporting Club Chabab Mohammédia

== List of champions ==
- 2009–10: CJ Khouribga
- 2010–11: CJ Khouribga
- 2011–12: Feth Settat
- 2012–13: CJ Khouribga
- 2013–14: Feth Settat
- 2014–15: Feth Settat
- 2015–16: Dynamo Kénitra
- 2016–17: Feth Settat
- 2017–18: Dynamo Kénitra
- 2018–19: Feth Settat
- 2019–20: Feth Settat
- 2020–21: SC Chabab Mohammédia
- 2021–22: SC Chabab Mohammédia
- 2022–23: SC Chabab Mohammédia
- 2023–24: AS Faucon Agadir
- 2024–25: Loukkous Ksar El Kebir
- 2024–25: Union Touarga

== See also ==
- Moroccan Futsal Cup
